Goldfields North, an electoral district of the Legislative Assembly in the Australian state of New South Wales was created in 1859 and abolished in 1880.


Election results

Elections in the 1870s

1877

1875

1872

Elections in the 1860s

1870 by-election

1870

1868 by-election

1865

1863 by-election

1860

Elections in the 1850s

1859

References 

New South Wales state electoral results by district